Craig Draper (born 4 December 1982) is a Welsh former professional footballer who played as a midfielder.

Career

Club career
Draper began his career with Swansea City, making 2 appearances in the Football League between 2001 and 2002. After leaving Swansea, Draper played for Llanelli.

References

1982 births
Living people
Welsh footballers
Swansea City A.F.C. players
Llanelli Town A.F.C. players
English Football League players
Association football midfielders
Garden Village A.F.C. players